This is the list of hobby schools (eg music schools, dance schools/studios) located in Estonia. The list is incomplete.

See also
 List of schools in Estonia

References 

 
Estonia